The 1955 Lehigh Engineers football team was an American football team that represented Lehigh University during the 1955 college football season. Lehigh placed second in the Middle Three Conference.

In their tenth year under head coach William Leckonby, the Engineers compiled a 7–2 record, 1–1 against conference opponents. Bruno Pagnani was the team captain.

Lehigh played its home games at Taylor Stadium on the university's main campus in Bethlehem, Pennsylvania.

Schedule

References

Lehigh
Lehigh Mountain Hawks football seasons
Lehigh Engineers football